Săcel may refer to several places in Romania:

 Săcel, a commune in Harghita County
 Săcel, a commune in Maramureș County
 Săcel, a village in Băișoara Commune, Cluj County
 Săcel, a village in Sântămăria-Orlea Commune, Hunedoara County
 Săcel, a district in the town of Săliște, Sibiu County

See also
Săcele